Nil Dünyası is an album by Nil Karaibrahimgil, a female Turkish singer and songwriter. Her debut album was released in 2002. The album sleeve was designed as a magazine. Nil Dünyası (Nil's World) is the name of the magazine. The headline of the magazine, "Özgür kızın albümü çıktı!" is a reference to her TV commercials, in which she played an independent backpacker girl. The sixth song "Pelin" is about Pelin Batu, one of Nil's friends from university, who is also an actress.

The first video for the album is shot for "XL". Later, this song was translated to English as "Your Love is XL". The second video became "Kek". The lyrics of the song include a recipe for orange cake. Similarly, in the music video she is hosting a "Cooking show", and making an orange cake. The last video from the album was "Resmen Aşığım". The video is produced from her first concert, it also has some footage images and notes.

Track listing

All songs are written by Nil Karaibrahimgil

External links 
 

2002 debut albums
Nil Karaibrahimgil albums
Albums produced by Ozan Çolakoğlu